Bromhall  may refer to:

Bromhall Priory
Andrew Bromhall
Broomhall, Cheshire, also known historically as Bromhall

See also
Broomhall (disambiguation)